Miyake is a Japanese surname. Notable people with the surname include:

People
, Japanese swimmer
Miyake Gunbei, vassal of Honda Tadamasa
, Japanese weightlifter
, Japanese mycologist
, Japanese fashion designer
, Japanese football player
, Japanese composer
, Japanese voice actor
, Japanese botanist
, American linguist
, Japanese cognitive scientist
, World War II general in the Imperial Japanese Army
, Japanese inventor
, Japanese philosopher
, Japanese women's footballer
, Japanese folklorist
Taro Miyake (1882–1935), Japanese wrestler
, Japanese daimyō
, Japanese weightlifter
, Japanese female singer
, Japanese politician
, Japanese composer and sound designer

Characters
Shinobu Miyake, a character from the manga series Urusei Yatsura

Japanese-language surnames